Stay Thirsty (foaled on 29 March 2008) is an American Thoroughbred racehorse sired by the leading stallion Bernardini.  He was bred in Kentucky by John D. Gunther and John Darren Gunther. His dam, Marozia, was sired by Storm Bird. Stay Thirsty was consigned as lot 1147 by Glenwood Farm to the 2009 Keeneland September yearling auction and was bought for $160,000 by Whitehorse Stables. His trainer, Todd Pletcher, bought him for his owner, Mike Repole, for $500,000 at the 2010 Fasig-Tipton sale of 2-year-olds in training in Florida.

Racing career

2010: two-year-old season
Stay Thirsty first raced in a maiden special weight race at Belmont Park on July 15, 2010, finishing second to Sovereign Default. He broke his maiden in an August 14, 2010, race at Saratoga Race Course. Stay Thirsty also placed in the Three Chimneys Hopeful Stakes on September 6, 2010, losing by 3/4 of a length to Boys At Tosconova. He finished fifth in the Grey Goose Breeders' Cup Juvenile at Churchill Downs on November 6, 2010. The race was won by stablemate Uncle Mo.

2011: three-year-old season
Stay Thirsty won the Grade 3 Gotham Stakes before coming second to Ruler on Ice in the 2011 Belmont Stakes.

2011 Travers Stakes
Like his sire five years earlier, Stay Thirsty has won both the Grade II Jim Dandy Stakes and the 2011 Grade I Travers Stakes.  In the Travers, in which he was favored to win, he competed against the top three leaders of the 3-year-old division: Shackleford (winner of the 2011 Preakness Stakes), Ruler on Ice (winner of the 2011 Belmont Stakes), and Coil (winner of the 2011 Haskell Invitational Handicap). He was also the first horse since 1901 to win from the number 9 post.

Stay Thirsty was ridden by Javier Castellano in the race, who also won his second straight Travers.  Castellano was the first rider in 30 years to win consecutive Travers Stakes.  The last to do so was National Museum of Racing and Hall of Fame jockey Eddie Maple, who won in 1980 and 1981. Castellano also won the 2006 Travers Stakes while riding Bernardini, Stay Thirsty's sire.

Stay Thirsty became the leader of the American 3-year-old colt division after the Travers win.  As of that date, he became the most likely 3-year-colt to be considered the best of his class for 2011.

Remainder of the season
Stay Thirsty was third in the Jockey Club Gold Cup Stakes. He then finished poorly in the 2011 Breeders' Cup Classic, finishing next to last in eleventh place behind the race favorite, Uncle Mo, who finished tenth.

2012: four-year-old season
Stay Thirsty returned to racing on May 17 in the Vanlandingham Stakes run at Belmont Park, where he finished second to Trickmeister. In July, Stay Thirsty finished fifth out of seven horses in the Grade II Suburban Handicap, having exited the starting gate poorly. He completed his racing career in November with a win in the Grade I Cigar Mile.

Stud career
He was retired after his four-year-old season and now stands at Ashford Stud, the American arm of the Irish breeding giant Coolmore near Versailles, Kentucky.

In 2017 Stay Thirsty was sold to Lovacre Ranch in Warner Springs, California, where his stud fee is set at $10,000.

Notable Progeny

Stay Thirsty has sired one Grade 1 winner:

'c = colt, f = filly, g = gelding

Pedigree
Stay Thirsty's sire, Bernardini (Bay, 2003) won the 2006 Preakness Stakes, Travers Stakes, Jim Dandy Stakes, Withers Stakes and the Jockey Club Gold Cup. He was sired by leading sire A.P. Indy, who also produced Mineshaft and Rags to Riches. His dam is Grade I winner Cara Rafaela (Quiet American – Oil Fable), who accrued $884,452 in her racing career. Cara Rafaela won the 1995 Hollywood Starlet Stakes and the Alcibiades Stakes and was Broodmare of the Year in 2006. She has produced nine foals, including Ile de France and Bold Legacy. 
 
Stay Thirsty's dam, Marozia (Chestnut, 1994), was sired by Storm Bird out of the mare Make Change. She was exported to the United Kingdom in 1995 and raced with limited success until age four, earning £6,220 ($10,367). She returned to the United States from Ireland in 1998 and has produced ten foals. Stay Thirsty was her eighth foal, and she also produced the graded stakes winners Andromeda's Hero and Superfly, by Fusaichi Pegasus. Her dam, Make Change, won the Miss Liberty Stakes and produced eight foals, including the filly Time Changes.

Racing statistics

External links
 Stay Thirsty partial stats and pedigree

References

2008 racehorse births
Thoroughbred family 4-c
Racehorses bred in Kentucky
Racehorses trained in the United States